Melikov, the Russified version of Armenian last name Melikyan was an Armenian noble family in the Kingdom of Georgia and later in the Russian Empire.

The family descended from an Armenian nobleman named Malek Miriman who hailed from Somkhiti, had converted to Islam and was enfeoffed with the melikdom of Lori by the Safavid Iranian king Tahmasp I (r. 1524–1576). Under the Safavids, the family continued to rise to prominence, and they were known as the Mirimanidze clan/family.

Later, the family returned to Christianity (Georgian Orthodox) and were confirmed as Princes Melikishvili and dukes of Somkhiti.

A branch of this family became Armenian Apostolic and came to be known as Loris-Melikov (Лорис-Меликов), which means Meliks of Lori (Princes of Lori). After the Russian annexation of Georgia, the family was received among the princely nobility (knyaz) of the Russian Empire, and was made famous by General Mikhail Tarielovich Loris-Melikov (1825–88) who was bestowed with the dignity of count in 1878.

Loris-Melikov branch

Prince of Lori, Count Mikhail Loris-Melikov and Princess Nina Ivanovna Argutinskaya-Dolgorukova
Maria (1858–1916), Italy, lady-in-waiting. Husband Sergey Evgeniy Novikov (married in 1859)
Sofia, born 1862
Tariel (1863–1941) Paris, Colonel of Life Guard of the Preobrazhenskiy Regiment. Wife Varvara Nikolaevna Argutinskaya-Dolgorukova (1872–1942, Paris),
Konstantin, died in childhood.
Zakhariy (1866–1896), Petersburg, single.
Elizabeth, Wiesbaden, Germany. Husband Baron Konstantin Stanislav von Nolken (1878–1949).

Tariel (Stepan) Loris-Melikov (1863–1941)
Colonel, Count, representative of an old Armenian princely-count family. The eldest son of the General-Lieutenant, the minister of internal Affairs of Russian Empire Count M.T. Loris Melikov. In 1913 reminded in chronics as the Colonel of Life Guard of the Preobrazhenskiy Regiment. Was married on the granddaughter of A.S.Pushkin on a female line – Princess Varvara Nikolay Argutinskaya-Dolgorukova (1872–1942, Paris). In Switzerland live continuers of the female line V. N. Argutinskaya-Dolgorukova – Count Aleksander Mikhail Loris Melikov (1926) and his four children Anna-Elizabeth, (1959), Dominica, (1961), Natalya (1963) and Mikhail (1964).

Oksen Tariel Loris Melikov (1895–1970)

Notable people with the surname
Isa Melikov (born 1980), Azerbaijani composer and producer
Genia Melikova (1924–2004), ballet dancer of Russian origin
Grigori Melikov (born 1976), Russian footballer 
Mikhail Loris-Melikov (1826–1888), Russian-Armenian statesman
Yuri Melikov (b. 1997), Armenian-Cypriot singer-songwriter
Sergey Melikov (b. 1965), governor of Dagestan

References

Armenian families
Armenian noble families
Noble families of Georgia (country)
Russian noble families